Cooperation:

 Cooperation - as used in the social sciences.
 Co-operation (evolution) - co-operative behaviors in biology
 Cooperative - economic model
 Microbial cooperation – cooperation between microorganisms

See also 

Concerted action (disambiguation)